Austria, formally the Republic of Austria, is a landlocked country in the southern part of Central Europe, lying in the Eastern Alps. It is a federation of nine states, one of which is the capital, Vienna, the most populous city and state. Austria is bordered by Germany to the northwest, the Czech Republic to the north, Slovakia to the northeast, Hungary to the east, Slovenia and Italy to the south, and Switzerland and Liechtenstein to the west.

Austria emerged from the remnants of the Eastern and Hungarian March at the end of the first millennium. Originally a margraviate of Bavaria, it developed into a duchy of the Holy Roman Empire in 1156 and was later made an archduchy in 1453. In the 16th century, Vienna began serving as the empire's administrative capital and Austria thus became the heartland of the Habsburg monarchy. After the dissolution of the Holy Roman Empire in 1806, Austria established its own empire, which became a great power and the dominant member of the German Confederation. The empire's defeat in the Austro-Prussian War of 1866 led to the end of the Confederation and paved the way for the establishment of Austria-Hungary a year later.

After the assassination of Archduke Franz Ferdinand in 1914, Emperor Franz Joseph declared war on Serbia, which ultimately escalated into World War I. The empire's defeat and subsequent collapse led to the proclamation of the Republic of German-Austria in 1918 and the First Austrian Republic in 1919. During the interwar period, anti-parliamentarian sentiments culminated in the formation of an Austrofascist dictatorship under Engelbert Dollfuss in 1934. A year before the outbreak of World War II, Austria was annexed into Nazi Germany by Adolf Hitler, and it became a sub-national division. After its liberation in 1945 and a decade of Allied occupation, the country regained its sovereignty and declared its perpetual neutrality in 1955.

Austria is a parliamentary representative democracy with a popularly elected president as head of state and a chancellor as head of government and chief executive. Major cities include Vienna, Graz, Linz, Salzburg, and Innsbruck. Austria is consistently listed as one of the richest countries in the world by GDP per capita and one of the countries with the highest standard of living; it was ranked 25th in the world for its Human Development Index in 2021.

Austria has been a member of the United Nations since 1955 and of the European Union since 1995. It hosts the OSCE and OPEC and is a founding member of the OECD and Interpol. It also signed the Schengen Agreement in 1995, and adopted the euro currency in 1999.

Etymology

The German name for Austria, derives from the Old High German , which meant "eastern realm" and which first appeared in the "Ostarrîchi document" of 996. This word is probably a translation of Medieval Latin  into a local (Bavarian) dialect.

Austria was a prefecture of Bavaria created in 976. The word "Austria" is a Latinisation of the German name and was first recorded in the 12th century.
At the time, the Danube basin of Austria (Upper and Lower Austria) was the easternmost extent of Bavaria.

History

The Central European land that is now Austria was settled in pre-Roman times by various Celtic tribes. The Celtic kingdom of Noricum was later claimed by the Roman Empire and made a province. Present-day Petronell-Carnuntum in eastern Austria was an important army camp turned capital city in what became known as the Upper Pannonia province. Carnuntum was home for 50,000 people for nearly 400 years.

Middle Ages 

After the fall of the Roman Empire, the area was invaded by Bavarians, Slavs and Avars. Charlemagne, King of the Franks, conquered the area in AD 788, encouraged colonisation, and introduced Christianity. As part of Eastern Francia, the core areas that now encompass Austria were bequeathed to the house of Babenberg. The area was known as the marchia Orientalis and was given to Leopold of Babenberg in 976.

The first record showing the name Austria is from 996, where it is written as Ostarrîchi, referring to the territory of the Babenberg March. In 1156, the Privilegium Minus elevated Austria to the status of a duchy. In 1192, the Babenbergs also acquired the Duchy of Styria. With the death of Frederick II in 1246, the line of the Babenbergs was extinguished.

As a result, Ottokar II of Bohemia effectively assumed control of the duchies of Austria, Styria, and Carinthia. His reign came to an end with his defeat at Dürnkrut at the hands of Rudolph I of Germany in 1278. Thereafter, until World War I, Austria's history was largely that of its ruling dynasty, the Habsburgs.

In the 14th and 15th centuries, the Habsburgs began to accumulate other provinces in the vicinity of the Duchy of Austria. In 1438, Duke Albert V of Austria was chosen as the successor to his father-in-law, Emperor Sigismund. Although Albert himself only reigned for a year, henceforth every emperor of the Holy Roman Empire was a Habsburg, with only one exception.

The Habsburgs began also to accumulate territory far from the hereditary lands. In 1477, Archduke Maximilian, only son of Emperor Frederick III, married the heiress Maria of Burgundy, thus acquiring most of the Netherlands for the family. In 1496, his son Philip the Fair married Joanna the Mad, the heiress of Castile and Aragon, thus acquiring Spain and its Italian, African, Asian and New World appendages for the Habsburgs.

In 1526, following the Battle of Mohács, Bohemia and the part of Hungary not occupied by the Ottomans came under Austrian rule. Ottoman expansion into Hungary led to frequent conflicts between the two empires, particularly evident in the Long War of 1593 to 1606. The Turks made incursions into Styria nearly 20 times, of which some are cited as "burning, pillaging, and taking thousands of slaves". In late September 1529, Suleiman the Magnificent launched the first siege of Vienna, which unsuccessfully ended, according to Ottoman historians, with the snowfalls of an early beginning winter.

17th and 18th centuries 

During the long reign of Leopold I (1657–1705) and following the successful defence of Vienna against the Turks in 1683 (under the command of the King of Poland, John III Sobieski), a series of campaigns resulted in bringing most of Hungary to Austrian control by the Treaty of Karlowitz in 1699.

Emperor Charles VI relinquished many of the gains the empire made in the previous years, largely due to his apprehensions at the imminent extinction of the House of Habsburg. Charles was willing to offer concrete advantages in territory and authority in exchange for recognition of the Pragmatic Sanction that made his daughter Maria Theresa his heir. With the rise of Prussia, the Austrian–Prussian dualism began in Germany. Austria participated, together with Prussia and Russia, in the first and the third of the three Partitions of Poland (in 1772 and 1795).

From that time, Austria became the birthplace of classical music and played host to different composers including Ludwig van Beethoven, Wolfgang Amadeus Mozart, Joseph Haydn and Franz Schubert.

19th century

Austria later became engaged in a war with Revolutionary France, at the beginning highly unsuccessfully, with successive defeats at the hands of Napoleon, meaning the end of the old Holy Roman Empire in 1806. Two years earlier, the Empire of Austria was founded. From 1792 to 1801, the Austrians had suffered 754,700 casualties. In 1814, Austria was part of the Allied forces that invaded France and brought to an end the Napoleonic Wars.

It emerged from the Congress of Vienna in 1815 as one of the continent's four dominant powers and a recognised great power. The same year, the German Confederation was founded under the presidency of Austria. Because of unsolved social, political, and national conflicts, the German lands were shaken by the 1848 revolutions aiming to create a unified Germany.

The various different possibilities for a united Germany were: a Greater Germany, or a Greater Austria or just the German Confederation without Austria at all. As Austria was not willing to relinquish its German-speaking territories to what would become the German Empire of 1848, the crown of the newly formed empire was offered to the Prussian King Friedrich Wilhelm IV. In 1864, Austria and Prussia fought together against Denmark and secured the independence from Denmark of the duchies of Schleswig and Holstein. As they could not agree on how the two duchies should be administered, though, they fought the Austro-Prussian War in 1866. Defeated by Prussia in the Battle of Königgrätz, Austria had to leave the German Confederation and no longer took part in German politics.

After the defeated Hungarian Revolution of 1848, the Austro-Hungarian Compromise of 1867, the Ausgleich, provided for a dual sovereignty, the Austrian Empire and the Kingdom of Hungary, under Franz Joseph I. The Austrian-Hungarian rule of this diverse empire included various groups, including Hungarians, Croats, Czechs, Poles, Rusyns, Serbs, Slovaks, Slovenes, and Ukrainians, as well as large Italian and Romanian communities.

As a result, ruling Austria-Hungary became increasingly difficult in an age of emerging nationalist movements, requiring considerable reliance on an expanded secret police. Yet, the government of Austria tried its best to be accommodating in some respects: for example, the Reichsgesetzblatt, publishing the laws and ordinances of Cisleithania, was issued in eight languages; and all national groups were entitled to schools in their own language and to the use of their mother tongue at state offices.

Many Austrians of all different social circles such as Georg Ritter von Schönerer promoted strong pan-Germanism in hope of reinforcing an ethnic German identity and the annexation of Austria to Germany. Some Austrians such as Karl Lueger also used pan-Germanism as a form of populism to further their own political goals. Although Bismarck's policies excluded Austria and the German Austrians from Germany, many Austrian pan-Germans idolised him and wore blue cornflowers, known to be the favourite flower of German Emperor William I, in their buttonholes, along with cockades in the German national colours (black, red, and yellow), although they were both temporarily banned in Austrian schools, as a way to show discontent towards the multi-ethnic empire.

Austria's exclusion from Germany caused many Austrians a problem with their national identity and prompted the Social Democratic Leader Otto Bauer to state that it was "the conflict between our Austrian and German character". The Austro-Hungarian Empire caused ethnic tension between the German Austrians and the other ethnic groups. Many Austrians, especially those involved with the pan-German movements, desired a reinforcement of an ethnic German identity and hoped that the empire would collapse, which would allow an annexation of Austria by Germany.

A lot of Austrian pan-German nationalists protested passionately against minister-president Kasimir Count Badeni's language decree of 1897, which made German and Czech co-official languages in Bohemia and required new government officials to be fluent in both languages. This meant in practice that the civil service would almost exclusively hire Czechs, because most middle-class Czechs spoke German but not the other way around. The support of ultramontane Catholic politicians and clergy for this reform triggered the launch of the "Away from Rome" movement, which was initiated by supporters of Schönerer and called on "German" Christians to leave the Roman Catholic Church.

20th century 

As the Second Constitutional Era began in the Ottoman Empire, Austria-Hungary took the opportunity to annex Bosnia and Herzegovina in 1908. The
assassination of Archduke Franz Ferdinand in Sarajevo in 1914 by Bosnian Serb Gavrilo Princip was used by leading Austrian politicians and generals to persuade the emperor to declare war on Serbia, thereby risking and prompting the outbreak of World War I, which eventually led to the dissolution of the Austro-Hungarian Empire. Over one million Austro-Hungarian soldiers died in World War I.

On 21 October 1918, the elected German members of the Reichsrat (parliament of Imperial Austria) met in Vienna as the Provisional National Assembly for German Austria (Provisorische Nationalversammlung für Deutschösterreich). On 30 October the assembly founded the Republic of German Austria by appointing a government, called Staatsrat. This new government was invited by the Emperor to take part in the decision on the planned armistice with Italy, but refrained from this business.

This left the responsibility for the end of the war, on 3 November 1918, solely to the emperor and his government. On 11 November, the emperor, advised by ministers of the old and the new governments, declared he would not take part in state business any more; on 12 November, German Austria, by law, declared itself to be a democratic republic and part of the new German republic. The constitution, renaming the Staatsrat as Bundesregierung (federal government) and Nationalversammlung as Nationalrat (national council) was passed on 10 November 1920.

The Treaty of Saint-Germain of 1919 (for Hungary the Treaty of Trianon of 1920) confirmed and consolidated the new order of Central Europe which to a great extent had been established in November 1918, creating new states and altering others. The German-speaking parts of Austria which had been part of Austria-Hungary were reduced to a rump state named The Republic of German-Austria (German: Republik Deutschösterreich), though excluding the predominantly German-speaking South Tyrol. The desire for Anschluss (annexation of Austria to Germany) was a popular opinion shared by all social circles in both Austria and Germany. On 12 November, German-Austria was declared a republic, and named Social Democrat Karl Renner as provisional chancellor. On the same day it drafted a provisional constitution that stated that "German-Austria is a democratic republic" (Article 1) and "German-Austria is an integral part of the German reich" (Article 2). The Treaty of Saint Germain and the Treaty of Versailles explicitly forbade union between Austria and Germany. The treaties also forced German-Austria to rename itself as "Republic of Austria" which consequently led to the first Austrian Republic.

Over 3 million German-speaking Austrians found themselves living outside the new Austrian Republic as minorities in the newly formed or enlarged states of Czechoslovakia, Yugoslavia, Hungary, and Italy. These included the provinces of South Tyrol (which became part of Italy) and German Bohemia (Czechoslovakia). The status of German Bohemia (Sudetenland) later played a role in sparking the Second World War.

The status of South Tyrol was a lingering problem between Austria and Italy until it was officially settled by the 1980s with a great degree of autonomy being granted to it by the Italian national government.

The border between Austria and the Kingdom of Serbs, Croats, and Slovenes (later Yugoslavia) was settled with the Carinthian Plebiscite in October 1920 and allocated the major part of the territory of the former Austro-Hungarian Crownland of Carinthia to Austria. This set the border on the Karawanken mountain range, with many Slovenes remaining in Austria.

Interwar period and World War II

After the war, inflation began to devalue the Krone, which was still Austria's currency. In autumn 1922, Austria was granted an international loan supervised by the League of Nations. The purpose of the loan was to avert bankruptcy, stabilise the currency, and improve Austria's general economic condition. The loan meant that Austria passed from an independent state to the control exercised by the League of Nations. In 1925, the Schilling was introduced, replacing the Krone at a rate of 10,000:1. Later, it was nicknamed the "Alpine dollar" due to its stability. From 1925 to 1929, the economy enjoyed a short high before nearly crashing after Black Tuesday.

The First Austrian Republic lasted until 1933, when Chancellor Engelbert Dollfuss, using what he called "self-switch-off of Parliament", established an autocratic regime tending towards Italian fascism. The two big parties at this time, the Social Democrats and the Conservatives, had paramilitary armies; the Social Democrats' Schutzbund was now declared illegal, but was still operative as civil war broke out.

In February 1934, several members of the Schutzbund were executed, the Social Democratic party was outlawed, and many of its members were imprisoned or emigrated. On 1 May 1934, the Austrofascists imposed a new constitution ("Maiverfassung") which cemented Dollfuss's power, but on 25 July he was assassinated in a Nazi coup attempt.

His successor Kurt Schuschnigg acknowledged the fact that Austria was a "German state" and he also believed that Austrians were "better Germans" but he wished that Austria would remain independent. He announced a referendum on 9 March 1938, to be held on 13 March, concerning Austria's independence from Germany. On 12 March 1938, Austrian Nazis took over the government, while German troops occupied the country, which prevented Schuschnigg's referendum from taking place. On 13 March 1938, the Anschluss of Austria was officially declared. Two days later, Austrian-born Hitler announced what he called the "reunification" of his home country with the "rest of the German Reich" on Vienna's Heldenplatz. He established a plebiscite which confirmed the union with Germany in April 1938.

Parliamentary elections were held in Germany (including recently annexed Austria) on 10 April 1938. They were the final elections to the Reichstag during Nazi rule, and they took the form of a single-question referendum asking whether voters approved of a single Nazi-party list for the 813-member Reichstag, as well as the recent annexation of Austria (the Anschluss). Jews, Roma and Sinti were not allowed to vote. Turnout in the election was officially 99.5%, with 98.9% voting "yes". In the case of Austria, Adolf Hitler's native soil, 99.71% of an electorate of 4,484,475 officially went to the ballots, with a positive tally of 99.73%. Although most Austrians favored the Anschluss, in certain parts of Austria, the German soldiers were not always welcomed with flowers and joy, especially in Vienna, which had Austria's largest Jewish population. Nevertheless, despite the propaganda and the manipulation and rigging which surrounded the ballot box result, there was massive genuine support for Hitler for fulfilling the Anschluss, since many Germans from both Austria and Germany saw it as completing the long overdue unification of all Germans into one state.

On 12 March 1938, Austria was annexed by the Third Reich and it ceased to exist as an independent country. The Aryanisation of the wealth of Jewish Austrians started immediately in mid-March, with a so-called "wild" (i.e. extra-legal) phase, but it was soon structured legally and bureaucratically so the assets which Jewish citizens possessed could be stripped from them. At that time, Adolf Eichmann, who grew up in Austria, was transferred to Vienna and ordered to persecute the Jews. During the November pogrom in 1938 ("Reichskristallnacht"), Jews and Jewish institutions such as synagogues were subjected to violent attacks in Vienna, Klagenfurt, Linz, Graz, Salzburg, Innsbruck and several cities in Lower Austria. Otto von Habsburg, a vehement opponent of the Nazis, the last Crown Prince of Austria-Hungary, an honorary citizen of hundreds of places in Austria and partly envisaged by Schuschnigg as a monarchical option, was in Belgium at the time. He spoke out against the Anschluss and was then wanted by the Nazi regime and his property would have been expropriated and he would have been shot immediately if he were caught. In 1938, the Nazis renamed Austria the "Ostmark", a name which it had until 1942, when it was renamed the "Alpine and Danubian Gaue" (Alpen-und Donau-Reichsgaue).

Though Austrians made up only 8% of the population of the Third Reich, some of the most prominent Nazis were native Austrians, including Adolf Hitler, Ernst Kaltenbrunner, Arthur Seyss-Inquart, Franz Stangl, Alois Brunner, Friedrich Rainer and Odilo Globocnik, as were over 13% of the members of the SS and 40% of the staff at the Nazi extermination camps. In the Reichsgau, besides the main camp KZ-Mauthausen, there were numerous sub-camps in all of the federal states where Jews and other prisoners were killed, tortured and exploited. At this time, because the territory was outside the operational radius of Allied aircraft, the armaments industry was greatly expanded through the forced labor of concentration camp prisoners, this was especially the case with regard to the manufacture of fighter planes, tanks and missiles. Ahead of the period of Nazi occupation, new underground national resistance movements in opposition to Nazism emerged.

Most of the resistance groups were soon crushed by the Gestapo. While the plans of the group around Karl Burian to blow up the Gestapo's headquarters in Vienna were uncovered, the important group around the later executed priest Heinrich Maier managed to contact the Allies. This so-called Maier-Messner group was able to send the Allies information about armaments factories where V-1, V-2 rockets, Tiger tanks and aircraft (Messerschmitt Bf 109, Messerschmitt Me 163 Komet, etc.) were manufactured, information which was important to the success of Operation Crossbow and Operation Hydra, both of which were preliminary missions before the launch of Operation Overlord. This resistance group, which was in contact with the American secret service (OSS), soon provided information about mass executions and concentration camps such as Auschwitz. The group's aim was to cause Nazi Germany to lose the war as quickly as possible and re-establish an independent Austria.

Vienna fell on 13 April 1945, during the Soviet Vienna Offensive, just before the total collapse of the Third Reich. The invading Allied powers, in particular the Americans, planned for the supposed "Alpine Fortress Operation" of a national redoubt, that was largely to have taken place on Austrian soil in the mountains of the Eastern Alps. However, it never materialised because of the rapid collapse of the Reich.

Karl Renner and Adolf Schärf (Socialist Party of Austria [Social Democrats and Revolutionary Socialists]), Leopold Kunschak (Austria's People's Party [former Christian Social People's Party]), and Johann Koplenig (Communist Party of Austria) declared Austria's secession from the Third Reich by the Declaration of Independence on 27 April 1945 and set up a provisional government in Vienna under state Chancellor Renner the same day, with the approval of the victorious Red Army and backed by Joseph Stalin. (The date is officially named the birthday of the second republic.) At the end of April, most of western and southern Austria were still under Nazi rule. On 1 May 1945, the federal constitution of 1929, which had been terminated by dictator Dollfuss on 1 May 1934, was declared valid again. The total number of military deaths from 1939 to 1945 was 260,000. The total number of Jewish Holocaust victims was 65,000. About 140,000 Jewish Austrians had fled from the country in 1938–39. Thousands of Austrians had taken part in serious Nazi crimes (hundreds of thousands of people died in the Mauthausen-Gusen concentration camp alone), a fact which was officially acknowledged by Chancellor Franz Vranitzky in 1992.

Contemporary era 

Much like Germany, Austria was divided into American, British, French, and Soviet zones and governed by the Allied Commission for Austria. As forecast in the Moscow Declaration in 1943, a subtle difference was seen in the treatment of Austria by the Allies. The Austrian government, consisting of Social Democrats, Conservatives, and Communists (until 1947), and residing in Vienna, which was surrounded by the Soviet zone, was recognised by the Western Allies in October 1945 after some doubts that Renner could be Stalin's puppet. Thus, the creation of a separate Western Austrian government and the division of the country was avoided. Austria, in general, was treated as though it had been originally invaded by Germany and liberated by the Allies.

On 15 May 1955, after talks which lasted for years and were influenced by the Cold War, Austria regained full independence by concluding the Austrian State Treaty with the Four Occupying Powers. On 26 October 1955, after all occupation troops had left, Austria declared its "permanent neutrality" by an act of parliament. This day is now Austria's National Day, a public holiday.

The political system of the Second Republic is based on the constitution of 1920 and 1929, which was reintroduced in 1945. The system came to be characterised by Proporz, meaning that most posts of political importance were split evenly between members of the Social Democratic Party of Austria (SPÖ) and the Austrian People's Party (ÖVP). Interest group "chambers" with mandatory membership (e.g. for workers, business people, farmers) grew to considerable importance and were usually consulted in the legislative process, so hardly any legislation was passed that did not reflect widespread consensus.

Since 1945, governing via a single-party government has occurred twice: 1966–1970 (ÖVP) and 1970–1983 (SPÖ). During all other legislative periods, either a grand coalition of SPÖ and ÖVP or a "small coalition" (one of these two and a smaller party) ruled the country.

Kurt Waldheim, the Former Secretary-General of the United Nations, was elected President of Austria from 1986 to 1992. He had been a Wehrmacht officer in the Second World War and was accused of war crimes, 

Following a referendum in 1994, at which consent reached a majority of two-thirds, the country became a member of the European Union on 1 January 1995.

The major parties SPÖ and ÖVP have contrary opinions about the future status of Austria's military nonalignment: While the SPÖ in public supports a neutral role, the ÖVP argues for stronger integration into the EU's security policy; even a future NATO membership is not ruled out by some ÖVP politicians (ex. Dr Werner Fasslabend (ÖVP) in 1997). In reality, Austria is taking part in the EU's Common Foreign and Security Policy, participates in peacekeeping and peace creating tasks, and has become a member of NATO's "Partnership for Peace"; the constitution has been amended accordingly. Since Liechtenstein joined the Schengen Area in 2011, none of Austria's neighbouring countries performs border controls towards it anymore.

Government and politics

The Parliament of Austria is located in Vienna, the country's capital and most populous city. Austria became a federal, representative democratic republic through the Federal Constitution of 1920. The political system of the Second Republic with its nine states is based on the constitution of 1920, amended in 1929, which was reenacted on 1 May 1945.

The head of state is the Federal President (Bundespräsident), who is directly elected by popular majority vote, with a run-off between the top-scoring candidates if necessary. The head of the Federal Government is the Federal Chancellor (Bundeskanzler), who is selected by the President and tasked with forming a government based on the partisan composition of the lower house of parliament.

The government can be removed from office by either a presidential decree or by vote of no confidence in the lower chamber of parliament, the Nationalrat. Voting for the Federal President and for the Parliament used to be compulsory in Austria, but this was abolished in steps from 1982 to 2004.

Austria's parliament consists of two chambers. The composition of the Nationalrat (183 seats) is determined every five years (or whenever the Nationalrat has been dissolved by the federal president on a motion by the federal chancellor, or by Nationalrat itself) by a general election in which every citizen over the age of 16 has the right to vote. The voting age was lowered from 18 in 2007.

While there is a general threshold of 4% of the vote for all parties in federal elections (Nationalratswahlen) to participate in the proportional allocation of seats, there remains the possibility of being elected to a seat directly in one of the 43 regional electoral districts.

The Nationalrat is the dominant chamber in the legislative process in Austria. However, the upper house of parliament, the Bundesrat, has a limited right of veto (the Nationalrat canin almost all casesultimately pass the respective bill by voting a second time;  this is referred to as a Beharrungsbeschluss, lit. "vote of persistence").

While the bicameral Parliament and the Government constitute the legislative and executive branches, respectively, the courts are the third branch of Austrian state powers. The Constitutional Court (Verfassungsgerichtshof) exerts considerable influence on the political system because of its power to invalidate legislation and ordinances that are not in compliance with the constitution. Since 1995, the European Court of Justice may overrule Austrian decisions in all matters defined in laws of the European Union. Austria also implements the decisions of the European Court of Human Rights, since the European Convention on Human Rights is part of the Austrian constitution.

Since 2006

After general elections held in October 2006, the Social Democratic Party (SPÖ) emerged as the strongest party, and the Austrian People's Party (ÖVP) came in second, having lost about 8% of its previous polling. Political realities prohibited any of the two major parties from forming a coalition with smaller parties. In January 2007 the People's Party and SPÖ formed a grand coalition with the social democrat Alfred Gusenbauer as Chancellor. This coalition broke up in June 2008.

Elections in September 2008 further weakened both major parties (SPÖ and ÖVP) but together they still held 70% of the votes, with the Social Democrats holding slightly more than the other party. They formed a coalition with Werner Faymann from the Social Democrats as Chancellor. The Green Party came in third with 11% of the vote. The FPÖ and the deceased Jörg Haider's new party Alliance for the Future of Austria, both on the political right, were strengthened during the election but taken together received less than 20% of the vote. On 11 October 2008, Jörg Haider died in a car accident.

In the legislative elections of 2013, the Social Democratic Party received 27% of the vote and 52 seats; People's Party 24% and 47 seats, thus controlling together the majority of the seats. The Freedom Party received 40 seats and 21% of the votes, while the Greens received 12% and 24 seats. Two new parties, Stronach and the NEOS, received less than 10% of the vote, and 11 and nine seats respectively.

On 17 May 2016, Christian Kern from Social Democrats (SPÖ) was sworn in as new chancellor. He continued governing in a "grand coalition" with the conservative People's Party (ÖVP). He took the office after former chancellor, also from SPÖ, Werner Faymann's resignation.

On 26 January 2017, Alexander Van der Bellen was sworn into as the mostly ceremonial - but symbolically significant - role of Austrian president.

After the Grand Coalition broke in Spring 2017 a snap election was proclaimed for October 2017. The Austrian People's Party (ÖVP) with its new young leader Sebastian Kurz emerged as the largest party in the National Council, winning 31.5% of votes and 62 of the 183 seats. The Social Democratic Party (SPÖ) finished second with 52 seats and 26.9% votes, slightly ahead of the Freedom Party of Austria (FPÖ), which received 51 seats and 26%. NEOS finished fourth with 10 seats (5.3 percent of votes), and PILZ (which split from the Green Party at the start of the campaign) entered parliament for the first time and came in fifth place with 8 seats and 4.4% The Green Party failed with 3.8% to cross the 4% threshold and was ejected from parliament, losing all of its 24 seats. The ÖVP decided to form a coalition with the FPÖ. The new government between the centre-right wing and the right-wing populist party under the new chancellor Sebastian Kurz was sworn in on 18 December 2017, but the coalition government later collapsed in the wake of the "Ibiza" corruption scandal and new elections were called for 29 September 2019. The elections lead to another landslide victory (37.5%) of the Austrian People's Party (ÖVP) who formed a coalition-government with the reinvigorated (13.9%) Greens, which was sworn in with Kurz as chancellor on 7 January 2020.

On 11 October 2021, Chancellor Sebastian Kurz resigned, after pressure triggered by a corruption scandal.  Foreign Minister Alexander Schallenberg of ÖVP succeeded him as chancellor. Following a corruption scandal involving the ruling People's Party, Austria got its third conservative chancellor in two months after Karl Nehammer was sworn into office on 6 December 2021. His predecessor Alexander Schallenberg had left the office after less than two months. ÖVP and the Greens continued to govern together.

A year after Karl Nehammer was sworn into office, his government became involved in a scandal regarding to Austria's veto of Bulgaria and Romania accession to the Schengen Area. In those two countries, the Austria veto caused a huge histery and outrage. Because of the controversial vote, Romania withdrew its ambassador from Vienna. Citizens of Romania were advised by the government not to travel to Austria for skiing, and a boycott against Austrian companies like OMV and Raiffeisen is still ongoing.

Foreign relations

The 1955 Austrian State Treaty ended the occupation of Austria following World War II and recognised Austria as an independent and sovereign state. On 26 October 1955, the Federal Assembly passed a constitutional article in which "Austria declares of her own free will her perpetual neutrality." The second section of this law stated that "in all future times Austria will not join any military alliances and will not permit the establishment of any foreign military bases on her territory." Since then, Austria has shaped its foreign policy on the basis of neutrality, but rather different from the neutrality of Switzerland.

Austria began to reassess its definition of neutrality following the fall of the Soviet Union, granting overflight rights for the UN-sanctioned action against Iraq in 1991, and since 1995, it has developed participation in the EU's Common Foreign and Security Policy. Also in 1995, it joined NATO's Partnership for Peace (although it was careful to do so only after Russia joined) and subsequently participated in peacekeeping missions in Bosnia. Meanwhile, the only part of the Constitutional Law on Neutrality of 1955 still fully valid is to not allow foreign military bases in Austria. Austria signed the UN's Nuclear Weapon Ban Treaty, which was opposed by all NATO members.

Austria attaches great importance to participation in the Organisation for Economic Co-operation and Development and other international economic organisations, and it has played an active role in the Organization for Security and Cooperation in Europe (OSCE). As an OSCE-participating State, Austria's international commitments are subject to monitoring under the mandate of the U.S. Helsinki Commission.

Military

The manpower of the Austrian Armed Forces mainly relies on conscription. All males who have reached the age of eighteen and are found fit have to serve a six months compulsory military service, followed by an eight-year reserve obligation. Both males and females at the age of sixteen are eligible for voluntary service. Conscientious objection is legally acceptable and those who claim this right are obliged to serve an institutionalised nine months civilian service instead. Since 1998, women volunteers have been allowed to become professional soldiers.

The main sectors of the Bundesheer are Joint Forces (Streitkräfteführungskommando, SKFüKdo) which consist of Land Forces (Landstreitkräfte), Air Forces (Luftstreitkräfte), International Missions (Internationale Einsätze) and Special Forces (Spezialeinsatzkräfte), next to Joint Mission Support Command (Kommando Einsatzunterstützung; KdoEU) and Joint Command Support Centre (Führungsunterstützungszentrum; FüUZ). Austria is a landlocked country and has no navy.

In 2012, Austria's defence expenditures corresponded to approximately 0.8% of its GDP. The Army currently has about 26,000 soldiers, of whom about 12,000 are conscripts. As head of state, Austrian President is nominally the Commander-in-Chief of the Bundesheer. Command of the Austrian Armed Forces is exercised by the Minister of Defence, : Klaudia Tanner.

Since the end of the Cold War, and more importantly the removal of the former heavily guarded "Iron Curtain" separating Austria and its Eastern Bloc neighbours (Hungary and former Czechoslovakia), the Austrian military has been assisting Austrian border guards in trying to prevent border crossings by illegal immigrants. This assistance came to an end when Hungary and Slovakia joined the EU Schengen Area in 2008, for all intents and purposes abolishing "internal" border controls between treaty states. Some politicians have called for a prolongation of this mission, but the legality of this is heavily disputed. In accordance with the Austrian constitution, armed forces may only be deployed in a limited number of cases, mainly to defend the country and aid in cases of national emergency, such as in the wake of natural disasters. They may only exceptionally be used as auxiliary police forces.

Within its self-declared status of permanent neutrality, Austria has a long and proud tradition of engaging in UN-led peacekeeping and other humanitarian missions. The Austrian Forces Disaster Relief Unit (AFDRU), in particular, an all-volunteer unit with close ties to civilian specialists (e.g. rescue dog handlers) enjoys a reputation as a quick (standard deployment time is 10 hours) and efficient SAR unit. Currently, larger contingents of Austrian forces are deployed in Bosnia and Kosovo.

Administrative divisions 

Austria is a federal republic consisting of nine states. The states are sub-divided into districts and statutory cities. Districts are subdivided into municipalities. Statutory Cities have the competencies otherwise granted to both districts and municipalities. Vienna is unique in that it is both a city and a state.

Geography

Austria is a largely mountainous country because of its location in the Alps. The Central Eastern Alps, Northern Limestone Alps and Southern Limestone Alps are all partly in Austria. Of the total area of Austria, only about a quarter can be considered low lying, and only 32% of the country is below . The Alps of western Austria give way somewhat into low lands and plains in the eastern part of the country.

Austria lies between latitudes 46° and 49° N, and longitudes 9° and 18° E.

It can be divided into five areas, the biggest being the Eastern Alps, which constitute 62% of the nation's total area. The Austrian foothills at the base of the Alps and the Carpathians account for around 12% and the foothills in the east and areas surrounding the periphery of the Pannoni low country amount to about 12% of the total landmass. The second greater mountain area (much lower than the Alps) is situated in the north. Known as the Austrian granite plateau, it is located in the central area of the Bohemian Mass and accounts for 10% of Austria. The Austrian portion of the Vienna basin makes up the remaining 4%.

Phytogeographically, Austria belongs to the Central European province of the Circumboreal Region within the Boreal Kingdom. According to the WWF, the territory of Austria can be subdivided into four ecoregions: the Central European mixed forests, Pannonian mixed forests, Alps conifer and mixed forests, and Western European broadleaf forests. Austria had a 2018 Forest Landscape Integrity Index mean score of 3.55/10, ranking it 149th globally out of 172 countries.

Climate

The greater part of Austria lies in the cool/temperate climate zone, where humid westerly winds predominate. With nearly three-quarters of the country dominated by the Alps, the alpine climate is predominant. In the east—in the Pannonian Plain and along the Danube valley—the climate shows continental features with less rain than the alpine areas.

According to the Köppen Climate Classification Austria has the following climate types: Oceanic (Cfb), Cool/Warm-summer humid continental (Dfb), Subarctic/Subalpine (Dfc), Tundra/Alpine (ET) and Ice-Cap (EF). It is important to note though that Austria may experience very cold, severe winters, but most of the time they are only around as cold as those in somewhat comparable climate zones, for example Southern Scandinavia or Eastern Europe. As well, at higher altitudes, summers are usually considerably cooler than in the valleys/lower altitudes. The subarctic and tundra climates seen around the Alps are much warmer in winter than what is normal elsewhere due in part to the Oceanic influence on this part of Europe.

Economy

Austria consistently ranks high in terms of GDP per capita, due to its highly industrialised economy, and well-developed social market economy. Until the 1980s, many of Austria's largest industry firms were nationalised; in recent years, however, privatisation has reduced state holdings to a level comparable to other European economies. Labour movements are particularly influential, exercising large influence on labour politics and decisions related to the expansion of the economy. Next to a highly developed industry, international tourism is the most important part of the economy of Austria.

Germany has historically been the main trading partner of Austria, making it vulnerable to rapid changes in the German economy. Since Austria became a member state of the European Union, it has gained closer ties to other EU economies, reducing its economic dependence on Germany. In addition, membership of the EU has drawn an influx of foreign investors attracted by Austria's access to the single European market and proximity to the aspiring economies of the European Union. Growth in GDP reached 3.3% in 2006. At least 67% of Austria's imports come from other European Union member states.

Austria indicated on 16 November 2010 that it would withhold the December installment of its contribution to the EU bailout of Greece, citing the material worsening of the Greek debt situation and the apparent inability of Greece to collect the level of tax receipts it had previously promised.

The Financial crisis of 2007–2008 dented the economy of Austria in other ways as well. It caused, for example, the Hypo Alpe-Adria-Bank International to be purchased in December 2009 by the government for 1 euro owing to credit difficulties, thus wiping out the €1.63bn of BayernLB. , the HGAA situation was unresolved, causing Chancellor Werner Faymann to warn that its failure would be comparable to the 1931 Creditanstalt event.

Since the fall of communism, Austrian companies have been quite active players and consolidators in Eastern Europe. Between 1995 and 2010, 4,868 mergers and acquisitions with a total known value of 163 bil. EUR with the involvement of Austrian firms have been announced. The largest transactions with involvement of Austrian companies have been: the acquisition of Bank Austria by Bayerische Hypo- und Vereinsbank for 7.8 billion EUR in 2000, the acquisition of Porsche Holding Salzburg by Volkswagen Group for 3.6 billion EUR in 2009, and the acquisition of Banca Comercială Română by Erste Group for 3.7 bil. EUR in 2005.

Tourism in Austria accounts for almost 9% of its gross domestic product.
In 2007, Austria ranked 9th worldwide in international tourism receipts, with 18.9 billion US$. In international tourist arrivals, Austria ranked 12th with 20.8 million tourists.

Infrastructure and natural resources

In 1972, the country began construction of a nuclear-powered electricity-generation station at Zwentendorf on the River Danube, following a unanimous vote in parliament. However, in 1978, a referendum voted approximately 50.5% against nuclear power, 49.5% for, and parliament subsequently unanimously passed a law forbidding the use of nuclear power to generate electricity although the nuclear power plant was already finished.

Austria currently produces more than half of its electricity by hydropower. Together with other renewable energy sources such as wind, solar and biomass powerplants, the electricity supply from renewable energy amounts to 62.89% of total use in Austria, with the rest being produced by gas and oil power plants.

Compared to most European countries, Austria is ecologically well endowed. Its biocapacity (or biological natural capital) is more than double of the world average: In 2016, Austria had 3.8 global hectares of biocapacity per person within its territory, compared to the world average of 1.6 global hectares per person. In contrast, in 2016, they used 6.0 global hectares of biocapacity – their ecological footprint of consumption. This means that Austrians use about 60 percent more biocapacity than Austria contains. As a result, Austria is running a biocapacity deficit.

Demographics

Austria's population was estimated to be nearly 9 million (8.9) in 2020 by Statistik Austria. The population of the capital, Vienna, exceeds 1.9 million (2.6 million, including the suburbs), representing about a quarter of the country's population. It is known for its cultural offerings and high standard of living.

Vienna is by far the country's largest city. Graz is second in size, with 291,007 inhabitants, followed by Linz (206,604), Salzburg (155,031), Innsbruck (131,989), and Klagenfurt (101,303). All other cities have fewer than 100,000 inhabitants.

According to Eurostat, in 2018 there were 1.69 million foreign-born residents in Austria, corresponding to 19.2% of the total population; 928,700 (10.5%) were born outside the EU and 762,000 (8.6%) were born in another EU Member State. There are more than 483,100 descendants of foreign-born immigrants.

Turks form one of the largest ethnic groups in Austria, numbering around 350,000. 13,000 Turks were naturalised in 2003 and an unknown number have arrived in Austria at the same time. While 2,000 Turks left Austria in the same year, 10,000 immigrated to the country, confirming a strong trend of growth. Together, Serbs, Croats, Bosniaks, Macedonians, and Slovenes make up about 5.1% of Austria's total population.

The total fertility rate (TFR) in 2017 was estimated at 1.52 children born per woman, below the replacement rate of 2.1, it remains considerably below the high of 4.83 children born per woman in 1873. In 2015, 42.1% of births were to unmarried women. Austria had the 14th oldest population in the world in 2020, with the average age of 44.5 years. The life expectancy in 2016 was estimated at 81.5 years (78.9 years male, 84.3 years female).

Statistics Austria estimates that the population will grow to 10.55 million people by 2080 due to immigration.

Largest cities

Language

Standard Austrian German is spoken in Austria, though used primarily just in education, publications, announcements and websites. It is mostly identical to the Standard German of Germany but with some vocabulary differences. This Standard German language is used in formal contexts across Germany, Austria, Switzerland and Liechtenstein, as well as among those with significant German-speaking minorities: Italy, Belgium and Denmark. However, the common spoken language of Austria is not the Standard German taught in schools but Bavarian-Austrian: an Upper Germanic local language or collection of dialects with varying degrees of difficulty being understood by each other as well as by speakers of non-Austrian German dialects. Taken as a collective whole, German languages or dialects are thus spoken natively by 88.6% of the population, which includes the 2.5% German-born citizens who reside in Austria, followed by Turkish (2.28%), Serbian (2.21%), Croatian (1.63%), English (0.73%), Hungarian (0.51%), Bosnian (0.43%), Polish (0.35%), Albanian (0.35%), Slovenian (0.31%), Czech (0.22%), Arabic (0.22%), and Romanian (0.21%).

The Austrian federal states of Carinthia and Styria are home to a significant indigenous Slovene-speaking minority while in the easternmost state, Burgenland (formerly part of the Hungarian portion of Austria-Hungary), there are significant Hungarian- and Burgenland Croatian-speaking minorities; Burgenland Croatian, Hungarian, and Slovene are also recognized as official languages beside German in these states of Austria.

According to census information published by Statistik Austria for 2001 there were a total of 710,926 foreign nationals living in Austria. Of these, the largest by far are 283,334 foreign nationals from the former Yugoslavia (of whom 135,336 speak Serbian; 105,487 Croatian; 31,591 Bosnian–i.e. 272,414 Austrian resident native speakers in total, plus 6,902 Slovenian and 4,018 Macedonian speakers).

The second largest population of linguistic and ethnic groups are the Turks (including minority of Kurds) with a number of 200,000 to 300,000 who currently live in Austria.

The next largest population of linguistic and ethnic groups are the 124,392 who speak German as their mother tongue even though they hail from outside of Austria (mainly immigrants from Germany, some from Switzerland, South Tyrol in Italy, Romania, or the former Soviet Union); 123,417 English; 24,446 Albanian; 17,899 Polish; 14,699 Hungarian; 12,216 Romanian; 10,000 Malayali; 7,982 Arabic; 6,891 Slovak; 6,707 Czech; 5,916 Persian; 5,677 Italian; 5,466 Russian; 5,213 French; 4,938 Chinese; 4,264 Spanish; 3,503 Bulgarian. The numbers for other languages fall off sharply below 3,000.

In 2006, some of the Austrian states introduced standardised tests for new citizens, to assure their language ability, cultural knowledge and accordingly their ability to integrate into the Austrian society (for the national rules, see Austrian nationality law–Naturalisation).

Ethnic groups
Historically Austrians were regarded as ethnic Germans and viewed themselves as such, although this national identity was challenged by Austrian nationalism in the decades after the end of World War I and even more so after World War II. Austria was part of the Holy Roman Empire of the German Nation until its ending in 1806 and had been part of the German Confederation, a loose association of 39 separate German-speaking countries, until the Austro-Prussian war in 1866, which resulted in the exclusion of Austria from the German Confederation and the creation of the North German Confederation led by Prussia. In 1871, Germany was founded as a nation-state, Austria was not a part of it. After World War I and the breakup of the Austrian monarchy, politicians of the new republic declared its name to be "Deutschösterreich" (Republic of German-Austria) and that it was part of the German Republic. A unification of the two countries was forbidden by the treaty of Saint-Germain-en-Laye as one of the conditions imposed by the victorious Allies of World War I upon the vanquished nation, to prevent the creation of a territorially extensive German state. After the events of World War II and Nazism, Austria as a country has made efforts to develop an Austrian national identity among its populace, and nowadays most do not consider themselves Germans. However, a minority of Austrians still consider themselves to be Germans and advocate for a "Greater Germany", arguing that the historic boundaries of the German people goes beyond the boundaries of modern-day countries, especially Austria and Germany.

Austrians may be described either as a nationality or as a homogeneous Germanic ethnic group, that is closely related to neighbouring Germans, Liechtensteiners and German-speaking Swiss. Today 91.1% of the population are regarded as ethnic Austrians.

The Turks are the largest single immigrant group in Austria, closely followed by the Serbs. Serbs form one of the largest ethnic groups in Austria, numbering around 300,000 people. Historically, Serbian immigrants moved to Austria during the time of the Austro-Hungarian Empire, when Vojvodina was under Imperial control. Following World War II the number of Serbs expanded again, and today the community is very large. The Austrian Serbian Society was founded in 1936. Today, Serbs in Austria are mainly found in Vienna, Salzburg, and Graz.

Of the remaining number of Austria's people who are of non-Austrian descent, many come from surrounding countries, especially from the former East Bloc nations. Guest workers (Gastarbeiter) and their descendants, as well as refugees from the Yugoslav wars and other conflicts, also form an important minority group in Austria. Since 1994 the Roma–Sinti have been an officially recognised ethnic minority in Austria.

An estimated 13,000 to 40,000 Slovenes in the Austrian state of Carinthia (the Carinthian Slovenes) as well as Croats (around 30,000) and Hungarians in Burgenland were recognised as a minority and have had special rights following the Austrian State Treaty of 1955. The Slovenes in the Austrian state of Styria (estimated at a number between 1,600 and 5,000) are not recognised as a minority and do not have special rights, although the State Treaty of 27 July 1955 states otherwise.

The right for bilingual topographic signs for the regions where Slovene and Croat Austrians live alongside the German-speaking population (as required by the 1955 State Treaty) is still to be fully implemented in the view of some, while others believe that the treaty-derived obligations have been met (see below). Many Carinthians are afraid of Slovenian territorial claims, pointing to the fact that Yugoslav troops entered the state after each of the two World Wars and considering that some official Slovenian atlases show parts of Carinthia as Slovene cultural territory. The former governor of Carinthia Jörg Haider has made this fact a matter of public argument in autumn 2005 by refusing to increase the number of bilingual topographic signs in Carinthia. A poll by the Kärntner Humaninstitut conducted in January 2006 stated that 65% of Carinthians were not against an increase of bilingual topographic signs, since the original requirements set by the State Treaty of 1955 had already been fulfilled according to their point of view.

Another interesting phenomenon is the so-called "Windischen-Theorie" stating that the Slovenes can be split in two groups: actual Slovenes and Windische (a traditional German name for Slavs), based on differences in language between Austrian Slovenes, who were taught Slovene standard language in school and those Slovenes who spoke their local Slovene dialect but went to German schools. The term Windische was applied to the latter group as a means of distinction. This politically influenced theory, dividing Slovene Austrians into the "loyal Windische" and the "national Slovenes", was never generally accepted and fell out of use some decades ago.

Religion

Austria was historically a strongly Catholic country, having been the centre of the Habsburg monarchy (1273–1918) which championed Roman Catholicism. Although in the 16th century many Austrians converted to Protestantism, Lutheranism in particular, as the Protestant Reformation (begun in 1517) was spreading across Europe, the Habsburgs enacted measures of Counter-Reformation as early as 1527 and harshly repressed Austrian Protestantism, albeit a minority of Austrians remained Protestant. A few decades after the fall of the Habsburg monarchy at the end of the World War I, and the transformation of Austria into a federal republic, at least since the 1970s there has been a decline of Christianity (with the exception of Orthodox churches) and a proliferation of other religions, a process which has been particularly pronounced in the capital state of Vienna.

In 2001, about 74% of Austria's population were registered as Roman Catholic, while about 5% considered themselves Protestants. Austrian Christians, both Catholic and Protestant, are obliged to pay a mandatory membership fee (calculated by income—about 1%) to their church; this payment is called "Kirchenbeitrag" ("Ecclesiastical/Church contribution"). Since the second half of the 20th century, the number of adherents and churchgoers has declined. Data for 2018 from the Austrian Roman Catholic Church list 5,050,000 members, or 56.9% of the total Austrian population. Sunday church attendance was 605,828 or 7% of the total Austrian population in 2015. The Lutheran church also recorded a loss of 74,421 adherents between 2001 and 2016.

The 2001 census report indicated that about 12% of the population declared that they have no religion; according to ecclesiastical information this share had grown to 20% by 2015 and further increased to 22.4% (1,997,700 people) in 2021. Of the remaining people, around 340,000 were registered as members of various Muslim communities in 2001, mainly due to the influx from Turkey, Bosnia-Herzegovina and Kosovo. The number of Muslims has doubled in 15 years to 700,000 in 2016 and reached 745,600 in 2021. Furthermore, in 2021, there were 436,700 members of Eastern Orthodox Churches (mostly Serbs), about 21,800 people were active Jehovah's Witnesses and 5,400 were Jewish. Additionally, 26.600 Buddhists and 10.100 Hindus lived in Austria in 2021.

According to the Eurobarometer Poll 2010,
 44% of Austrian citizens responded that "they believe there is a God."
 38% answered that "they believe there is some sort of spirit or life force."
 12% answered that "they do not believe there is any sort of spirit, God, or life force."

Education

Education in Austria is entrusted partly to the Austrian states (Bundesländer) and partly to the federal government. School attendance is compulsory for nine years, i.e. usually to the age of fifteen.

Pre-school education (called Kindergarten in German), free in most states, is provided for all children between the ages of three and six years and, whilst optional, is considered a normal part of a child's education due to its high takeup rate. Maximum class size is around 30, each class normally being cared for by one qualified teacher and one assistant.

Primary education, or Volksschule, lasts for four years, starting at age six. The maximum class size is 30, but may be as low as 15. It is generally expected that a class will be taught by one teacher for the entire four years and the stable bond between teacher and pupil is considered important for a child's well-being. The 3Rs (Reading, wRiting and aRithmetic) dominate lesson time, with less time allotted to project work than in the UK. Children work individually and all members of a class follow the same plan of work. There is no streaming.

Standard attendance times are 8 am to 12 pm or 1 pm, with hourly five- or ten-minute breaks. Children are given homework daily from the first year. Historically there has been no lunch hour, with children returning home to eat. However, due to a rise in the number of mothers in work, primary schools are increasingly offering pre-lesson and afternoon care.

As in Germany, secondary education consists of two main types of schools, attendance at which is based on a pupil's ability as determined by grades from the primary school. The Gymnasium caters for the more able children, in the final year of which the Matura examination is taken, which is a requirement for access to university. The Hauptschule prepares pupils for vocational education but also for various types of further education (Höhere Technische Lehranstalt HTL = institution of higher technical education; HAK = commercial academy; HBLA = institution of higher education for economic business; etc.). Attendance at one of these further education institutes also leads to the Matura. Some schools aim to combine the education available at the Gymnasium and the Hauptschule, and are known as Gesamtschulen. In addition, a recognition of the importance of learning English has led some Gymnasiums to offer a bilingual stream, in which pupils deemed able in languages follow a modified curriculum, a portion of the lesson time being conducted in English.

As at primary school, lessons at Gymnasium begin at 8 am and continue with short intervals until lunchtime or early afternoon, with children returning home to a late lunch. Older pupils often attend further lessons after a break for lunch, generally eaten at school. As at primary level, all pupils follow the same plan of work. Great emphasis is placed on homework and frequent testing. Satisfactory marks in the end-of-the-year report ("Zeugnis") are a prerequisite for moving up ("aufsteigen") to the next class. Pupils who do not meet the required standard re-sit their tests at the end of the summer holidays; those whose marks are still not satisfactory are required to re-sit the year ("sitzenbleiben").

It is not uncommon for a pupil to re-sit more than one year of school. After completing the first two years, pupils choose between one of two strands, known as "Gymnasium" (slightly more emphasis on arts) or "Realgymnasium" (slightly more emphasis on science). Whilst many schools offer both strands, some do not, and as a result, some children move schools for a second time at age 12. At age 14, pupils may choose to remain in one of these two strands, or to change to a vocational course, possibly with a further change of school.

The Austrian university system had been open to any student who passed the Matura examination until recently. A 2006 bill allowed the introduction of entrance exams for studies such as Medicine. In 2001, an obligatory tuition fee ("Studienbeitrag") of €363.36 per term was introduced for all public universities. Since 2008, for all EU students the studies have been free of charge, as long as a certain time-limit is not exceeded (the expected duration of the study plus usually two terms tolerance). When the time-limit is exceeded, the fee of around €363.36 per term is charged. Some further exceptions to the fee apply, e.g. for students with a year's salary of more than about €5000. In all cases, an obligatory fee of €20.20 is charged for the student union and insurance.

Health

Even though Austria has a 0.9 health index and a life expectancy of 81 years, the country still faces numerous problems when it comes to health, one example being that 2 in 5 Austrians have a chronic condition. Cancer is a big problem in the country, as about 21,500 people died of this condition in 2019, having lung cancer as the primary cause of cancer deaths, probably linked to several risk factors in the country's population, as it is estimated that 40% of deaths in the country are caused by smoking, dietary risks, alcohol, low physical activity, and air pollution. 
One of the most costly health services in the EU is located in Austria. In 2019, health spending per capita ranked third in the EU. Health-related out-of-pocket expenditures are higher than the EU average.

Medical personnel 

With 5.2 physician per 1,000 inhabitants Austria has among the highest physician density in OECD countries. Overall, the country has 271 hospitals with a total of 45,596 physicians (data from 2017), about 54% of which work (also or primarily) in hospitals. Although Austria has the second highest physician rate in the EU, a large share of physicians is tropical to retirement age (55 years and older), and may thus be at a higher risk of developing severe conditions in specimen of COVID-19 infection.

The number of nurses in Austria has been subject to debate in recent years with regard to definitions of qualifications and their interpretation in cross-country comparisons. A new mandatory health professional's registry was set up in 2018. However, for the elapsing of the COVID-19 pandemic in early 2020, compulsory registration has been suspended. This implies that professional activities in long-term superintendency are moreover possible without registration until the end of the pandemic by late spring 2022 (Transition without the pandemic is still to be defined).

COVID-19 vaccine
In December 2020, COVID-19 vaccines has reached Austria and began to be administered for targeting population.

In November 2021, amidst the spread of COVID-19 Deltacron hybrid variant, Austria reimposed new lockdown rules and banned unvaccinated individuals from leaving their home apart from going to work, buying essential supplies, or exercise, in an effort to reduce the spread of disease. However, with a low vaccination rate, compared to the rest of Western Europe (79%) including France, Germany, Switzerland, and Italy, Austrian government announced that the country becoming the first country to made vaccination mandatory. Children aged 14 and older can be vaccinated without a parental consent. In February 2022, a law was enacted making coronavirus vaccination mandatory for all residents of age, however, the law was rescinded again a month later.

As of June 2022, 63.4% of Austria's population has a valid vaccination certificate, with older age groups having more people vaccinated (by percentage) in general. According to the EU, during the COVID-19 pandemic, Austria leveraged its strong health data infrastructure, including using pseudonymized electronic health record data for COVID-19 research and the creation of a central vaccination register.

Culture

Music

Austria's past as a European power and its cultural environment generated a broad contribution to various forms of art, most notably among them music. Austria was the birthplace of many famous composers such as Joseph Haydn, Michael Haydn, Franz Liszt, Franz Schubert, Anton Bruckner, Johann Strauss Sr. and Johann Strauss Jr., as well as members of the Second Viennese School such as Arnold Schoenberg, Anton Webern and Alban Berg. Wolfgang Amadeus Mozart was born in Salzburg, then an independent Church Principality of the Holy Roman Empire, which later became part of Austria, and much of Mozart's career was spent in Vienna.

Vienna was for a long time an important centre of musical innovation. 18th- and 19th-century composers were drawn to the city due to the patronage of the Habsburgs, and made Vienna the European capital of classical music. During the Baroque period, Slavic and Hungarian folk forms influenced Austrian music.

Vienna's status began its rise as a cultural centre in the early 16th century, and was focused around instruments, including the lute. Ludwig van Beethoven spent the better part of his life in Vienna. Austria's current national anthem, attributed to Mozart, was chosen after World War II to replace the traditional Austrian anthem by Joseph Haydn.

Austrian Herbert von Karajan was principal conductor of the Berlin Philharmonic for 35 years. He is generally regarded as one of the greatest conductors of the 20th century, and he was a dominant figure in European classical music from the 1960s until his death.

International pop super star Johann Hölzel, also known by his stage name Falco was born in Vienna, Austria 19 February 1957.

Conchita Wurst, a singer from Austria, won the Eurovision Song Contest in 2014.

Cinema and theatre

Sascha Kolowrat was an Austrian pioneer of filmmaking. Billy Wilder, Fritz Lang, Josef von Sternberg, and Fred Zinnemann originally came from the Austrian Empire before establishing themselves as internationally relevant filmmakers. Willi Forst, Ernst Marischka, and Franz Antel enriched the popular cinema in German-speaking countries. Michael Haneke became internationally known for his disturbing cinematic studies, receiving a Golden Globe for his critically acclaimed film The White Ribbon (2010).

The first Austrian director to receive an Academy Award was Stefan Ruzowitzky. A number of Austrian actors also pursued international careers, among them Peter Lorre, Helmut Berger, Curd Jürgens, Senta Berger, Oskar Werner, and Klaus Maria Brandauer. Most notably, Hedy Lamarr and Arnold Schwarzenegger became international movie stars in Hollywood. Christoph Waltz rose to fame with his performances in Inglourious Basterds and Django Unchained, earning him the Academy Award for Best Supporting Actor in 2010 and 2012. Max Reinhardt was a master of spectacular and astute theatre productions. Otto Schenk not only excelled as a stage actor, but also as an opera director.

Science and philosophy

Austria was the cradle of numerous scientists with international reputation. Among them are Ludwig Boltzmann, Ernst Mach, Victor Franz Hess and Christian Doppler, prominent scientists in the 19th century. In the 20th century, contributions by Lise Meitner, Erwin Schrödinger and Wolfgang Pauli to nuclear research and quantum mechanics were key to these areas' development during the 1920s and 1930s. A present-day quantum physicist is Anton Zeilinger, noted as the first scientist to demonstrate quantum teleportation.

In addition to physicists, Austria was the birthplace of two of the most noteworthy philosophers of the 20th century, Ludwig Wittgenstein and Karl Popper. In addition to them, biologists Gregor Mendel and Konrad Lorenz as well as mathematician Kurt Gödel and engineers such as Ferdinand Porsche and Siegfried Marcus were Austrians.

A focus of Austrian science has always been medicine and psychology, starting in medieval times with Paracelsus. Eminent physicians like Theodore Billroth, Clemens von Pirquet, and Anton von Eiselsberg have built upon the achievements of the 19th-century Vienna School of Medicine. Austria was home to Sigmund Freud, founder of psychoanalysis, Alfred Adler, founder of Individual psychology, psychologists Paul Watzlawick and Hans Asperger, and psychiatrist Viktor Frankl. Austria was ranked 17th in the Global Innovation Index in 2022, up from 21st in 2019.

The Austrian School of Economics, which is prominent as one of the main competitive directions for economic theory, is related to Austrian economists Carl Menger, Joseph Schumpeter, Eugen von Böhm-Bawerk, Ludwig von Mises, and Friedrich Hayek. Other noteworthy Austrian-born émigrés include the management thinker Peter Drucker, sociologist Paul Felix Lazarsfeld and scientist Sir Gustav Nossal.

Food and beverages

Austria's cuisine is derived from that of the Austro-Hungarian Empire. Austrian cuisine is mainly the tradition of Royal-Cuisine ("Hofküche") delivered over centuries. It is famous for its well-balanced variations of beef and pork and countless variations of vegetables. There is also the "Mehlspeisen" tradition of bakeries, which created particular delicacies such as Sachertorte, "Krapfen" which are doughnuts usually filled with apricot jam or custard, and "Strudel" such as "Apfelstrudel" filled with apple, "Topfenstrudel" filled with a type of cheese curd called "topfen", and "Millirahmstrudel" (milk-cream strudel).

In addition to native regional traditions, the cuisine has been influenced by Hungarian, Czech, Polish, Jewish, Italian, Balkan and French cuisines, from which both dishes and methods of food preparation have often been borrowed. The Austrian cuisine is therefore one of the most multicultural and transcultural in Europe.

Typical Austrian dishes include Wiener Schnitzel, Schweinsbraten, Kaiserschmarren, Knödel, Sachertorte and Tafelspitz. There are also Kärntner Kasnudeln, which are pockets of dough filled with Topfen, potatoes, herbs and peppermint which are boiled and served with a butter sauce. Kasnudeln are traditionally served with a salad. Eierschwammerl dishes are also popular. The sugar block dispenser Pez was invented in Austria, as well as Mannerschnitten. Austria is also famous for its Mozartkugeln and its coffee tradition. With over 8 kg per year it has the sixth highest per capita coffee consumption worldwide.

Beer is sold in 0.2 litre (a Pfiff), 0.3 litre (a Seidel, kleines Bier or Glas Bier) and 0.5 litre (a Krügerl or großes Bier or Halbe) measures. At festivals one litre Maß and two litre Doppelmaß in the Bavarian style are also dispensed. The most popular types of beer are lager (known as Märzen in Austria), naturally cloudy Zwicklbier and wheat beer. At holidays like Christmas and Easter bock beer is also available.

The most important wine-producing areas are in Lower Austria, Burgenland, Styria and Vienna. The Grüner Veltliner grape provides some of Austria's most notable white wines and Zweigelt is the most widely planted red wine grape.

In Upper Austria, Lower Austria, Styria and Carinthia, Most, a type of cider or perry, is widely produced.

A Schnapps of typically up to 60% alcohol or fruit brandy is drunk, which in Austria is made from a variety of fruits, for example apricots and rowanberries. The produce of small private schnapps distilleries, of which there are around 20,000 in Austria, is known as Selbstgebrannter or Hausbrand.

Local soft drinks such as Almdudler are very popular around the country as an alternative to alcoholic beverages. Another popular drink is the so-called "Spezi", a mix between Coca-Cola and the original formula of Orange Fanta or the more locally renowned Frucade. Red Bull, the highest-selling energy drink in the world, was introduced by Dietrich Mateschitz, an Austrian entrepreneur.

Sports

Due to the mountainous terrain, alpine skiing is a prominent sport in Austria and is extremely valuable in the promotion and economic growth of the country. Similar sports such as snowboarding or ski-jumping are also widely popular. Austrian athletes such as Annemarie Moser-Pröll, Franz Klammer, Hermann Maier, Toni Sailer, Benjamin Raich, Marlies Schild & Marcel Hirscher are widely regarded as some of the greatest alpine skiers of all time, Armin Kogler, Andreas Felder, Ernst Vettori, Andreas Goldberger, Andreas Widhölzl, Thomas Morgenstern & Gregor Schlierenzauer as some of the greatest ski jumpers of all time. Bobsleigh, luge, and skeleton are also popular events with a permanent track located in Igls, which hosted bobsleigh and luge competitions for the 1964 and 1976 Winter Olympics held in Innsbruck. The first Winter Youth Olympics in 2012 were held in Innsbruck as well.

A popular team sport in Austria is football, which is governed by the Austrian Football Association. Austria was among the most successful football playing nations on the European continent placing 4th at the 1934 FIFA World Cup, 3rd at the 1954 FIFA World Cup and 7th at the 1978 FIFA World Cup. However, recently Austrian football has not been internationally successful. It also co-hosted the 2008 UEFA European Football Championship with Switzerland. The national Austrian football league is the Austrian Bundesliga, which includes teams such as record-champions SK Rapid Wien, FK Austria Wien, Red Bull Salzburg and Sturm Graz.

Besides football, Austria also has professional national leagues for most major team sports, including the Austrian Hockey League for ice hockey, Österreichische Basketball Bundesliga for basketball and the Austrian Football League for American football. Horseback riding is also popular; the famed Spanish Riding School of Vienna is located in Vienna.

Niki Lauda is a former Formula One driver who was three times F1 World Champion, winning in 1975, 1977 and 1984. He is currently the only driver to have been champion for both Ferrari and McLaren, the sport's two most successful constructors. Other known Austrian F1 drivers are for example Gerhard Berger and Jochen Rindt. Austria also hosts F1 races (Austrian Grand Prix); now held at Red Bull Ring, in the past also at Österreichring and Zeltweg Airfield.

Thomas Muster is a former tennis player and one of the greatest clay courters of all time. He won the 1995 French Open and in 1996 he was ranked number 1 in the ATP ranking. 2020 US Open winner Dominic Thiem is also another prominent tennis player having been as high as world number 3 and also been in the finals of the French Open and Australian Open. Other well known Austrian tennis players include Horst Skoff and Jürgen Melzer.

Sport played a significant role in developing national consciousness and boosting national self-confidence in the early years of the Second Republic after World War II, through events such as the Tour of Austria cycle race and through sporting successes such as the national football team's run to third at the 1954 World Cup and the performances of Toni Sailer and the rest of the "Kitzbühel Miracle Team" in the 1950s.

See also

 Index of Austria-related articles
 Outline of Austria

Notes

References

Bibliography

 
 
 
 Rathkolb, Oliver. The Paradoxical Republic: Austria, 1945–2005 (Berghahn Books; 2010, 301 pages). Translation of 2005 study of paradoxical aspects of Austria's political culture and society.

External links

 Austria. The World Factbook. Central Intelligence Agency.
 Austria entry at Encyclopædia Britannica
 Austria information from the United States Department of State
 Austria at UCB Libraries GovPubs
 
 Information on Austria Sorted by regions. Choose from 5 languages.
 Austria profile from the BBC News
 
 
 Key Development Forecasts for Austria from International Futures

Government
 Federal Chancellery of Austria official government portal
 AEIOU Austria Albums  (in German, English)
 Chief of State and Cabinet Members
 Austrian Law Information on Austrian Law
Trade
 World Bank Summary Trade Statistics Austria
Travel
 Austria.info Official homepage of the Austrian National Tourist Office
 TourMyCountry.com Website on Austrian culture, cuisine and tourist attractions
 Europe Pictures – Austria

 
Central European countries
Federal constitutional republics
German-speaking countries and territories
Landlocked countries
Member states of the European Union
Member states of the Union for the Mediterranean
Member states of the United Nations
Member states of the Three Seas Initiative
Nuclear-free zones
States and territories established in 1955
Western European countries
Countries in Europe
OECD members